Spring Branch may refer to:

 A spring branch, a stream carrying the outflow of a spring to a nearby primary stream
 Spring Branch (Murderkill River tributary), a stream in Kent County, Delaware
 Spring Branch (Little Blue River tributary), a stream in Missouri
 Spring Branch, Comal County, Texas, city north of San Antonio
 Spring Branch, Houston, a community in Houston, Texas
 Spring Branch Independent School District, serving Spring Branch in Houston and nearby areas

See also
 Springs Branch (disambiguation)